Lize Duyvis (1889-1964) was a Dutch painter.

Biography
Duyvis was born on 12 December 1889 in Utrecht. She studied with Coba Ritsema, Willem Elisa Roelofs, Jr. (Dutch, 1874–1940), and Jan Adam Zandleven. In 1915 she married H.C. Hooft Hasselaar. Her work was included in the 1939 exhibition and sale Onze Kunst van Heden (Our Art of Today) at the Rijksmuseum in Amsterdam.

Duyvis died on 5 August 1964 in Apeldoorn.

References

1889 births
1964 deaths
Artists from Utrecht
20th-century Dutch women artists